Isaac Donnithorne Walker (8 January 1844 – 6 July 1898) was an English cricketer.

Walker was born in Southgate, London, the youngest of seven cricket-playing brothers. The family were part-owners of Taylor Walker & Co brewery in Limehouse. 

He was a right-handed batsman and an underarm slow right-arm bowler. He played for Marylebone Cricket Club (MCC) (1862–1884), a Middlesex XI (1862–1863) and Middlesex County Cricket Club (1864–1884). He succeeded his brother Edward as captain of Middlesex in 1873 and served in the post for twelve seasons.

His family's cricket ground at Southgate is maintained by the Walker Trust to this day. He died at Regent's Park, aged 54. His estate was valued at £195,483.

References

External links
 

1844 births
1898 deaths
English cricketers
Middlesex cricket captains
People from Southgate, London
Gentlemen of the South cricketers
Surrey Club cricketers
Gentlemen cricketers
North v South cricketers
Marylebone Cricket Club cricketers
Southgate cricketers
Orleans Club cricketers
Gentlemen of England cricketers
Isaac 02
Cricketers from Greater London
Middlesex cricketers
Gentlemen of Middlesex cricketers
Gentlemen of Marylebone Cricket Club cricketers
R. D. Walker's XI cricketers